Louis Lloyd (born 15 October 2003) is a Welsh footballer who plays as a forward for Wrexham.

Career
Lloyd was first called up to a Shrewsbury Town matchday squad on 19 September 2020, remaining unused in a 2–1 home loss to Northampton Town in EFL League One. He made his debut on 10 November in a 4–3 win at Crewe Alexandra in the EFL Trophy group stage, as a last-minute substitute for hat-trick scorer Shilow Tracey.

On 30 November 2022, Lloyd returned to Wrexham following a successful trial.

Career statistics

Club

References

2003 births
Living people
Welsh footballers
Association football forwards
Wrexham A.F.C. players
Connah's Quay Nomads F.C. players
Shrewsbury Town F.C. players